This is a list of Canadian Football League regular season records by teams that played in the Canadian Football League as well as the Interprovincial Rugby Football Union and the Western Interprovincial Football Union that preceded it.

Streaks
Longest winning streak, overall
Calgary Stampeders 22 (Aug 25, 1948 to Oct 22, 1949)
Edmonton Eskimos 14 (Oct 16, 1954 to Oct 1, 1955) 
BC Lions 14 (Oct 17, 2004 to Sep 24, 2005)
Calgary Stampeders 14 (Jul 21, 2016 to Oct 21, 2016)
Winnipeg Blue Bombers 12 (Aug 3, 2001 to Oct 26, 2001)

Longest winning streak, home
Calgary Stampeders 27 (Sep 20, 1992 to Aug 18, 1995)
Montreal Alouettes 20 (Nov 8, 1953 to Nov 3, 1956)
Edmonton Eskimos 17 (Oct 4, 1954 to Oct 1, 1956) 
Toronto Argonauts 17 (Jul 17, 1996 to Jul 9, 1998)
Calgary Stampeders 17 (Oct 31, 2015 to Sept 29, 2017)

Longest winning streak, away
Winnipeg Blue Bombers 21 (Aug 11, 1960 to Sep 24, 1962)
Calgary Stampeders 13 (Sep 3, 1948 to Aug 26, 1950)
Saskatchewan Roughriders 9 (Sep 10, 1969 to Sep 12, 1970)
Ottawa Rough Riders 8 (Nov 6, 1948 to Sep 23, 1950)
BC Lions 8 (Sept 28, 1984, to Sept 20, 1985)
BC Lions 8 (Oct 4, 1998, to Sept 12, 1999)
Calgary Stampeders 8 (Nov 5, 1994 to Oct 9, 1995)

Longest winning streak, in one regular season
Calgary Stampeders 14 (2016)
Calgary Stampeders 12 (1948)
Winnipeg Blue Bombers 12 (2001)
BC Lions 11 (2005)
Calgary Stampeders 11 (2017)

Longest winning streak, to start regular season
Calgary Stampeders 12 (1948)
BC Lions 11 (2005)
Edmonton Eskimos 10 (1955) 
Winnipeg Blue Bombers 10 (1960)

Longest winning streak, to end regular season
Calgary Stampeders 12 (1948)
Hamilton Tiger-Cats 10 (1972)
Edmonton Eskimos 8 (1982, 2015) 

Most consecutive seasons, above .500
Edmonton Eskimos 14 (1984 to 1997) 
Calgary Stampeders 14 (2008 to 2022) 
Calgary Stampeders 12 (1989 to 2000)
Edmonton Eskimos 11 (1972 to 1982) 
Toronto Argonauts 11 (1933 to 1947)

Longest losing streak, overall
Ottawa Senators/Rough Riders 25 (Nov 10, 1928 to Oct 7, 1933)
Hamilton Wildcats 16 (Oct 17, 1948 to Nov 5, 1949)
Shreveport Pirates 14 (Jul 6, 1994 to Oct 8, 1994)
BC Lions 13 (Oct 19, 1957 to Oct 6, 1958)
Edmonton Eskimos 13 (Sep 21, 1963 to Sep 4, 1964) 
Winnipeg Blue Bombers 13 (Aug 18, 1964 to Jul 30, 1965)
Ottawa Rough Riders 13 (Jul 19, 1987 to Oct 30, 1987)
Hamilton Tiger-Cats 13 (Oct 27, 2002 to Sep 6, 2003)
Montreal Alouettes 13 (Aug 19, 2017 to Jun 22, 2018)

Longest losing streak, home
Edmonton Eskimos/Elks 17 (October 26, 2019 to October 21, 2022)
Ottawa Rough Riders 14 (Jul 19, 1987 to Oct 22, 1988)
Ottawa Rough Riders 12 (Oct 13, 1928 to Nov 5, 1932)
Ottawa Redblacks 12 (Oct 16, 2021 to Oct 29, 2022)
Ottawa Redblacks 11 (July 5, 2019 to Sep 22, 2021)

Longest losing streak, away
Montreal Alouettes 22 (Oct 5, 1980 to Oct 9, 1983)
Toronto Argonauts 18 (Jul 9, 1992 to Nov 7, 1993)
Ottawa Rough Riders 18 (Oct 1, 1994 to Aug 24, 1996)
Ottawa Rough Riders 15 (Aug 27, 1988 to Oct 15, 1989)

Longest losing streak, to start regular season
Shreveport Pirates 14 (Jul 6, 1994 to Oct 8, 1994)
Hamilton Wildcats 12 (Sep 3, 1949 to Nov 5, 1949)
Saskatchewan Roughriders 12 (Jul 11, 1979 to Oct 7, 1979)
Hamilton Tiger-Cats 12 (Jun 20, 2003 to Sep 6, 2003)

Longest losing streak, to end regular season
Winnipeg Blue Bombers 13 (Aug 18, 1964 to Nov 1, 1964)
Hamilton Wildcats 12 (Sep 3, 1949 to Nov 5, 1949)
Montreal Alouettes 11 (Aug 19, 2017 to Nov 3, 2017)
Ottawa Redblacks 11 (Aug 9, 2019 to Nov 1, 2019)

Most consecutive seasons, .500 or less
Ottawa Rough Riders 17 (1980 to 1996)
BC Lions 12 (1965 to 1976)
Calgary Stampeders 12 (1950 to 1961)
Toronto Argonauts 8 (1974 to 1981)

Most consecutive playoffs appearances
Edmonton Eskimos 34 (1972 to 2005) 
BC Lions 20 (1997 to 2016)
Montreal Alouettes 19 (1996 to 2014)
Winnipeg Blue Bombers 17 (1980 to 1996)
Calgary Stampeders 17 (2005 to 2022)

Standings
Most Wins, season
Edmonton Eskimos 16 (1989) 
Calgary Stampeders 15 (1993, 1994, 1995, 2014, 2016)
Baltimore Stallions 15 (1995)
Toronto Argonauts 15 (1996, 1997)	
Montreal Alouettes 15 (2009)
Hamilton Tiger-Cats 15 (2019)
Winnipeg Blue Bombers 15 (2022)

Highest Winning Percentage (Minimum 12 game season)
Calgary Stampeders 1.000 (12-0-0) (1948)	
Calgary Stampeders .929 (13-1-0) (1949)
Ottawa Rough Riders .917 (11-1-0) (1949)	
Edmonton Eskimos .906 (14-1-1) (1981) 
Edmonton Eskimos .889 (16-2-0) (1989) 

Most Losses, season
Hamilton Tiger-Cats 17 (2003)
Ottawa Rough Riders 16 (1988)
Hamilton Tiger-Cats 16 (1997)
Ottawa Redblacks 16 (2014)

Scoring
Most Points For
Calgary Stampeders 698 (1994)
Toronto Argonauts 689 (1990)
Edmonton Eskimos 671 (1991) 
BC Lions 661 (1991)
Toronto Argonauts 660 (1997)

Most Points Allowed
Saskatchewan Roughriders 710 (1991)
Ottawa Rough Riders 685 (1995)
BC Lions 667 (1992)
Shreveport Pirates 662 (1994)
Winnipeg Blue Bombers 653 (1995)

Fewest Points Allowed (Minimum 12 game season)
Calgary Stampeders 61 (1948)
Calgary Stampeders 77 (1949)
Saskatchewan Roughriders 102 (1949)
Ottawa Rough Riders 103 (1947)
Edmonton Eskimos 117 (1955) 

Fewest Points Allowed (Minimum 18 game season)
Edmonton Eskimos 302 (1989) 
Montreal Alouettes 324 (2009)
Toronto Argonauts 326 (1988)
Toronto Argonauts 327 (1997)
Toronto Argonauts 336 (2007)

Most Points Scored, one team, one game	
Montreal Alouettes vs Hamilton 82 (Oct 20, 1956)
Toronto Argonauts vs Calgary 70 (Sep 20, 1990)	
Toronto Argonauts vs BC 68 (Sep 1, 1990)
Winnipeg Blue Bombers vs Hamilton 68 (Oct 19, 1991)

Largest Victory Margin
Montreal Alouettes 82 vs Hamilton 14 (+68) (Oct 20, 1956)
Edmonton Eskimos 63 vs Ottawa 3 (+60) (Aug 27, 1995) 
Calgary Stampeders 60 vs Hamilton 1 (+59) (Jul 29, 2017)
Winnipeg Blue Bombers 58 vs Montreal 2 (+56) (Aug 18, 1982)
Winnipeg Blue Bombers 56 vs Saskatchewan 0 (+56) (Jul 5, 1986)

References

2021 CFL Guide & Record Book

Records
Sports competition records